Balaka seemannii is a species of flowering plant in the family Arecaceae that is endemic to  Fiji; growing in mixed forests on Vanua Levu and Taveuni islands.

References

External links
Balaka seemannii page with photos from the Palm and Cycad Societies of Australia (PACSOA)

seemannii
Plants described in 1882
Endemic flora of Fiji
Least concern plants
Taxa named by Odoardo Beccari
Taxonomy articles created by Polbot